La Fontenelle is the name of two communes in France:
La Fontenelle, Ille-et-Vilaine 
La Fontenelle, Loir-et-Cher

See also
Fontenelle (disambiguation)
Guy Éder de La Fontenelle - infamous 16th century bandit in Brittany, France during the wars of the Holy League.